Yudhvir Singh Malik (born 19 March 1959) is a retired 1983 batch IAS officer of Haryana cadre.

Education 
Malik is a graduate (BA) and postgraduate (MA) in English literature. He also has a graduate degree in Journalism and Mass Communication. In addition, Malik is a postgraduate (MSc) in Development Management.

Career 
Yudhvir Singh Malik has served in various key positions for both the Union Government and the Government of Haryana, like as Additional Chief Secretary (Mines and Geology), Additional Chief Secretary (Industries and Commerce), Additional Chief Secretary (Revenue and Disaster Management), Additional Chief Secretary (Environment and Forests), Project Director of Haryana State AIDS Control Society, Managing Director of Haryana State Industrial and Infrastructure Development Corporation (HSIIDC), and as the Deputy Commissioner and District Magistrate of Hisar district in the Haryana Government, and as the Union Road Transport and Highways Secretary, Chairman of National Highways Authority of India (NHAI), Special Secretary in NITI Aayog, Chief Executive Officer (CEO) of Food Safety and Standards Authority of India (FSSAI) and as a Joint Secretary in the Ministry of Corporate Affairs in the Union Government.

Chairman of NHAI 
Yudhvir Singh Malik was appointed as the Chairman of National Highways Authority of India (NHAI) by the Appointments Committee of the Cabinet (ACC) in November 2016, he assumed office on 28 November 2016, and demitted it on 21 June 2017.

Road Transport and Highways Secretary 
Yudhvir Singh Malik was appointed as the Union Road Transport and Highways Secretary by the Appointments Committee of the Cabinet (ACC) in June 2017, he assumed the office of Secretary on 21 June 2017.

References

External links 
 Executive Record Sheet as maintained by Department of Personnel and Training of Government of India
 Profile at Bloomberg's website

Living people
1959 births
People from Hisar district
Indian Administrative Service officers
District magistrate